Zakhmi Rooh (Wounded Soul) is a 1993 Hindi horror film of Bollywood directed by Pawan Kumar and produced by Balwinder Sandhi.

Plot
This is the story of twin sisters Rima and Sima. Rima is attracted to a boy named Shekhar, who is already in love with Sima. Broken hearted, Rima goes to their father but is entrapped by some unholy persons who rape and kill her. Now her soul revives with a vengeful intention.

Cast
 Javed Jaffrey as Shekhar
 Moon Moon Sen as Rima/Sima
 Raj Kiran as Rocky
 Urmila Bhatt as Shekhar's mother
 Mac Mohan as Mak
 Puneet Issar
 Shiva Rindani as Sanki
 Dinesh Thakur
 Kamal Kapoor as Rima and Sima's father
 Harish Kumar
 Jay Kalgutkar
 Seema Vaz
 Pushpa Verma

Music
Composer: Nandi Duggal 
Lyrics: Dilip Tahir

"Aaja Aaja Meri Bahon Mein Aa" - Amit Kumar
"Ang Se Ang Mila Le" - Asha Bhosle 
"Kisne Samjha Kisne Jaana" - Asha Bhosle 
"Tu Hain Mera, Main Hoon Teri" - Amit Kumar, Asha Bhosle
"Dil Mera Tu Le Le" - Nandi Duggal
"Kehta Hoon Zamane Se" - Nandi Duggal
"Teri Tapti Jawani" - Abhijeet Bhattacharya, Dilraj Kaur

References

External links
 

1993 films
1990s Hindi-language films
Indian horror films
1993 horror films
Hindi-language horror films